Nii Armah Ashitey is a Ghanaian lawyer and politician. He is the Member of Parliament for Korle Klottey and is also the former minister for employment and labour relations in the Ghanaian government.

Work
Ashietey studied at the Kwame Nkrumah University of Science and Technology at Kumasi, the capital of the Ashanti Region of Ghana. He graduated in 1975 with a Bachelor of Arts degree in social sciences. He later became a barrister-at-law in 1986 after studying at the Ghana School of Law. He worked as the chief executive officer of Ocerec Company Limited in Accra before going into politics.

Politics
Ashitey was the chief executive for the Tema Metropolitan Area from 1993 to 2001. He joined the National Democratic Congress and stood on their ticket in the Ghanaian general election in December 2004, losing narrowly to the New Patriotic Party candidate Nii Adu Daku Mante. Four years later, he stood again for the same seat,  winning with 50.6% of the vote and a majority of 2,622 (4.3%).

In 2009, he was appointed as the regional minister for the Greater Accra Region by President Mills. He continued in this position after the death of Mills. After John Dramani Mahama won the Ghanaian general election in December 2012, he was appointed as the new minister for employment and labour relations.

See also
 Korle Klottey

References

External links
 Profile on GhanaDistricts.com

Living people
1950 births
Ghanaian Anglicans
National Democratic Congress (Ghana) politicians
Kwame Nkrumah University of Science and Technology alumni
20th-century Ghanaian lawyers
Ghanaian MPs 2009–2013
Ghanaian MPs 2013–2017
Government ministers of Ghana
Ghana School of Law alumni